Tone, Tóne or Þone is a given name, nickname and a surname.  Tone is a Slovene masculine given name in use as a short form of Anton in Slovenia. It is also a Danish, Finnish, Norwegian and Swedish feminine given name used as an alternate form of Torny and a short form of Antona in Norway, Sweden, Finland, Republic of Karelia, Estonia, Greenland and Denmark. Tóne is a Portuguese masculine given name in use as a diminutive of Antônio and António in Portugal, Brazil, South Africa, Namibia, Angola and Mozambique. Þone is an Old Norse feminine given name that is used as a form of Torny in parts of Norway, Sweden, Iceland, France, England and Scotland as well as in Denmark.

Given name

Female
Tone Åse (born 1965), Norwegian singer
Tone Benjaminsen, Norwegian cyclist
Tone Heimdal Brataas (born 1970), Norwegian politician
Tone Dahle (born 1945), Norwegian cross-country skier 
Tone Damli (born 1988), Norwegian singer
Tone Danielsen (born 1946), Norwegian actress
Tone Fossum, Norwegian cyclist
Tone Gunn Frustøl (born 1975), Norwegian footballer
Tone Haugen (born 1964), Norwegian professional footballer
Tone Hødnebø (born 1962), Norwegian poet, translator and magazine editor
Tone Groven Holmboe (born 1930), Norwegian composer
Tone Hulbækmo (born 1957), Norwegian singer and musician
Tone Liljeroth (born 1975), Norwegian politician
Tone Hatteland Lima (born 1979), Norwegian cyclist
Tone Lise Moberg (born 1970), Norwegian singer
Tone Mostraum (born 1974), Norwegian actress
 Tone Tangen Myrvoll (born 1965), Norwegian deaf cross country skier
Tone Nyhagen (1963–2015), Norwegian sport dancer
Tone Norum (born 1965), Swedish singer
Tone Pahle (born 1954), Norwegian sport rower
Tone Rasmussen (born 1968), Norwegian canoer
Tone Rønoldtangen (born 1953), Norwegian trade unionist and politician
Tone Thiis Schjetne (1928–2015), Norwegian sculptor
Tone Schwarzott (born 1941), Norwegian actress and poet
Tone Sekelius (born 1997), Swedish social media influencer and singer
Tone Anne Alvestad Seland, Norwegian handball player
Tone Skogen (born 1953), Norwegian civil servant and politician
Tone Sønsterud (born 1959), Norwegian politician
Tone Sverdrup (born 1951), Norwegian jurist
Tone Tingsgård (born 1944), Swedish politician
Tone Vigeland (born 1938), Norwegian goldsmith/silversmith and jewelry designer
Tone Wilhelmsen Trøen (born 1966), Norwegian politician

Male
Tone Čufar (1905–1942), Slovene writer and playwright
Tone Dečman (1913–1989), Slovene skier
Tone Đurišič (born 1961), Slovene cross-country skier
Tone Gazzari (1912–1996), Yugoslav swimmer
Tone Glenn Küsel-Gabriel (born 1996), Ghanaian footballer
Tone Kham (fl. 1633–1637), king of Lan Xang
Tone Kopelani (born 1978) New Zealand rugby player
Tone Kralj (1900–1975), Slovene artist
Tone Pavček (1928–2011), Slovene poets, translators, and essayists
Tone Partljič (born 1940), Slovene writer and politician
Tone Perčič (born 1954), Slovene writer and translator
Tone Peršak (born 1947), Slovene politician
Tone Razinger (fl. 1921), Slovene cross-country skier
Tone Tiselj (born 1961), Slovene handball coach and player
Tone Wieten (born 1994), Dutch rower
Tone Žnidaršič (1923–2007), Slovene artist

Stage name/nickname
Tone, American producer and member of the production group Trackmasters
Tone, alias of Tony Chung, member of Taiwanese-American mainstream pop duo Cool Silly
Chef Tone, professional name of Tony Scales (born 1983), American male songwriter and record producer
Juris Tone (born 1961), Latvian male bobsledder
King Tone, nickname of Antonio Fernandez, American male gang leader
Tone Bell, professional name of Michael Anthony Bell II (born 1983), American male stand-up comedian and actor
Tone Brulin, whose birthname was Antoon Maria Albert van den Eynde (born 1926), Belgian male dramatist
Tone Hočevar, nickname of Antun Hočevar (born 1951), Yugoslav male canoeist
Tone Janša, nickname of Anton Janša (born 1943), Slovene male jazz musician
Tone Lōc, stage name of Anthony Terrell Smith, (born 1966), American male rapper and actor
Tone Pogačnik, nickname of Anton Pogačnik (1919–2013), Slovene male cross-country skier
Tone Seliškar, nickname of Anton Seliškar (1900–1969), Slovene male writer, poet, journalist and teacher
Tone Trump, stage name of Tony Brice, (born 1977), American male rapper

Fictional characters
Dial Tone (G.I. Joe), two G. I. Joe toyline characters

Surname
Chiaki Tone (born 1992), Japanese male baseball player
Franchot Tone (1905–1968), American male actor
Lama Tone (born 1971), New Zealand male rugby player
Mariko Tone (born 1962), Japanese female singer, actress and essayist
Philip Willis Tone (1923–2001), American male judge
Ryosuke Tone (born 1991), Japanese male football player
Sulu Tone-Fitzpatrick (born 1992), New Zealand female netball and rugby sevens player
Wolfe Tone (1763–1798), Irish male revolutionary figure
Yasunao Tone (born 1935), Japanese male artist
Art Van Tone (1918–1990), American male football player and coach

See also

Ross Tones, a.k.a. Throwing Snow, producer for the music group Snow Ghosts
Tønes (born 1972), artistic name of Norwegian singer Frank Tønnesen
Toney (name)
Tono (name)
Tonye

Notes

Portuguese masculine given names
Slovene masculine given names
Danish feminine given names
Finnish feminine given names
Norwegian feminine given names
Swedish feminine given names